The Hartford FoxForce were a professional co-ed tennis team in Connecticut that competed in the World TeamTennis (WTT).

History
In 1999, owner Lisa Wilson-Foley and her husband franchised the World TeamTennis team Hartford FoxForce in Hartford, Connecticut. FoxForce's first drafted player was Monica Seles. In 2001 the team fielded brothers Murphy Jensen and Luke Jensen. Over the years the team fielded other well known players such as Bethanie Mattek-Sands, Boris Becker, and James Blake. The team played first at Hartford's 3,000 seat State Arsenal and Armory and later at a 2,500 seat outdoor stadium Wilson-Foley had built at her Blue Fox Run golf course in Avon, Connecticut. The Foley's shut the team down in 2007 due to a lack of corporate sponsorships.

Record

Season standings

2005 season

Coach history
 Paul Assaiante (2000-2002, 2004)
 Peter Bradshaw (2003)
 Donald Johnson (2006)

Former players
 Cam Bhuta (2002)
 James Blake (2000, 2002-2003)
 Doug Bohaboy (2000)
 Goran Dragicevic (2006)
 Mardy Fish (2004)
 Geoff Grant (2002)
 Levar Harper-Griffith (2000)
 Liezel Huber (2000)
 Stephen Huss (2004)
 Luke Jensen (2001-2002)
 Murphy Jensen (2000-2002)
 Sonya Jeyaseelan (2001)
 Donald Johnson (2004-2005)
 Magdalena Maleeva (2001)
 Bethanie Mattek-Sands (2000)
 Lisa McShea (2004-2006)
 Martina Müller (2003)
 Rossana de los Ríos (2002)
 Mark Philippoussis (2005)
 Aleco Preovolos (2005)
 Monica Seles (2000-2001)
 Milagros Sequera (2003-2005)
 Meghann Shaughnessy (2002-2006)
 Bryanne Stewart (2002)
 Betty Ann Grubb Stuart (2002)
 Wesley Whitehouse (2004-2005)

References

Defunct World TeamTennis teams
Tennis in Connecticut
Defunct sports teams in Connecticut
1999 establishments in Connecticut
2007 disestablishments in Connecticut
Sports clubs established in 1999
Sports clubs disestablished in 2007
Sports teams in Hartford, Connecticut
Avon, Connecticut